Julian Edmund Davies FRS (born January 1932) is a British microbiologist, professor emeritus, and Principal Investigator of the Davies Lab, at University of British Columbia.

Education and personal life
Born in January 1932, Davies earned a B.Sc. in 1953 and a Ph.D. in 1956 from the University of Nottingham.

Career
His research focuses on the interaction of small molecules, and especially antibiotics, with bacteria. He made important advances in understanding how antibiotics worked and how bacteria become resistant to them, especially the origin of genes for resistance.

Publications
He is the author or co-author of several hundred scientific papers and at least 6 books.

Awards and honours
He was elected a Fellow of the Royal Society in 1994 and is also a Fellow of the Royal Society of Canada and a Foreign Member of the US National Academy of Sciences. He is a former president of the American Society for Microbiology. 

He is a member of the Faculty of 1000.

He has received the American Society for Microbiology Gold Medal, Society for General Microbiology Prize, and was the recipient of the Bristol–Myers Squibb Award for Distinguished Achievement in Infectious Diseases Research in 1999.

References

External links
 Small Talk: Signalling in the Microbial World, Madison Wisconsin, 23 November 2015

Living people
1932 births
British microbiologists
Fellows of the Royal Society
Foreign associates of the National Academy of Sciences
Alumni of the University of Nottingham
Academic staff of the University of British Columbia